Marilyn and Me is a 1991 American television film. It premiered on the History Channel in India on May 12, 2006, in Double 'F'.

The film portrays the life of Robert Slatzer, an American writer who claimed to have married Marilyn Monroe in Mexico on 4 October 1952 (although there is no proof that this happened) and said that he met her when she was just beginning acting. Their secret affair shatters and rebuilds several times, as Marilyn is torn apart between her career and her lover.

Cast
 Susan Griffiths as Marilyn Monroe
 Jesse Dabson as Robert Slatzer
 Terry Moore as Woman at Hyde's Funeral
 Sandy McPeak as Darryl F. Zanuck
 Kurt Fuller as Harry Lipton
 Michael Cavanaugh as Walter Winchell
 Joel Grey as Johnny Hyde
 Sal Landi as Joe DiMaggio
 Marla Adams as Gladys Pearl Baker
 Richard Roat as Western Director
 David Wells as Tom Kelley

Episodes

External links

1990s American films
1990s biographical drama films
1990s English-language films
1991 films
1991 television films
ABC Motion Pictures films
American biographical drama films
American docudrama films
American drama television films
Cultural depictions of Joe DiMaggio
Fictional married couples
Films about Marilyn Monroe
Films directed by John Patterson
History (American TV channel) original programming